Walter Nicholas ("Nick") Henry Tongue (born 8 April 1973 in Auckland) is a former freestyle swimmer from New Zealand, who competed at the 1996 Summer Olympics in Atlanta, United States for his native country.

External links 
 Profile on NZ Olympic Committee website 
 
 
 

1973 births
Living people
Olympic swimmers of New Zealand
New Zealand male freestyle swimmers
Swimmers at the 1996 Summer Olympics
Swimmers from Auckland
Medalists at the FINA World Swimming Championships (25 m)
Swimmers at the 1994 Commonwealth Games
Swimmers at the 1998 Commonwealth Games
Commonwealth Games silver medallists for New Zealand
Commonwealth Games medallists in swimming
20th-century New Zealand people
21st-century New Zealand people
Medallists at the 1994 Commonwealth Games